Stromeferry railway station is a station on the Kyle of Lochalsh Line, serving the village of Stromeferry in the Highlands, northern Scotland. Stromeferry lies on the southern shore of Loch Carron, across from the ruined Strome Castle, near the west coast. ScotRail, who manage the station, operate all services.

History

The station opened for passenger traffic on 19 August 1870.

For the first 27 years of its existence it was the line's terminus, bringing prosperity to the village. Steamer services linked to Portree on Skye, and Stornoway on Lewis. With the opening of the extension to Kyle of Lochalsh, steamer services were transferred there.

The station was host to a LMS caravan from 1935 to 1939. A camping coach was positioned here by the Scottish Region from 1952 to 1967, for the last two years a Pullman camping coach was used.

In the 1970s under British Rail, Stromeferry became the railhead for the Kishorn Yard. Construction material was brought in by train, then transferred by ship.

Accidents and incidents 
On 3 June 1883 the station was occupied by 150 Sabbatarians, defeating the local police force and railway employees, to prevent the despatch of fish to London. They were objecting to the transport of fish on a Sunday.

The station was destroyed by fire along with a train of 14 vehicles on 16 October 1891.

Facilities 
Facilities at the station are minimal, consisting of a shelter, a help point, a bench and cycle racks. The station is step-free. As there are no facilities to purchase tickets, passengers must buy one in advance, or from the guard on the train.

Passenger volume 

The statistics cover twelve month periods that start in April.

Services 
Four trains each way call on weekdays/Saturdays and one each way all year on Sundays, plus a second from May to late September only.

References

Bibliography

External links

 Video footage of the station on YouTube

Railway stations in Highland (council area)
Railway stations served by ScotRail
Railway stations serving harbours and ports in the United Kingdom
Railway stations in Great Britain opened in 1870
Former Highland Railway stations